John Howard Pyle (March 25, 1906 – November 29, 1987) was an American broadcaster and politician who served as the ninth governor of the U.S. state of Arizona from 1951 to 1955. He was a Republican. As an opponent of polygamy, he authorized a raid on a Fundamentalist Church of Jesus Christ of Latter Day Saints compound. He served as an official in the Eisenhower administration.

Pyle graduated from Arizona State University in 1930 and was a member of Lambda Chi Alpha fraternity. He was a program director for a radio station and served as a war correspondent during World War II. He was the first Governor of Arizona who was born in the 20th century.

Biography
Born in 1906 in Sheridan, Wyoming, Pyle was the first governor of Arizona to be born in the 20th century and was the Program Director of KFAD (now KTAR) Radio in Phoenix from 1930 to 1951. He also served as a war correspondent during World War II and covered the surrender ceremony of the Japanese. Pyle defeated pioneering female politician Ana Frohmiller in his 1950 campaign for governor. He served as Governor of Arizona from 1951 to 1955.

In 1953, he attempted to break up a polygamous fundamentalist Mormon compound in Colorado City, Arizona, in what became known as the Short Creek Raid, which resulted in two dozen men arrested and 236 children placed in foster homes. This move alienated many voters in the state after photographs of tearful children being forcibly removed from their distraught mothers appeared in the newspapers. Later citing the negative reaction by the voters to the Short Creek raid as the cause, Pyle subsequently lost his 1954 re-election bid for a third term to his Democratic opponent, former Senate Majority Leader Ernest McFarland and left office in January 1955.

After his governorship ended Pyle joined the Eisenhower administration as Deputy Assistant to the President, working primarily as a policy liaison responsible for the Joint Federal-State Action Committee promoting stronger, more responsible local government. He resigned in 1959 to accept an appointment as president of the National Safety Council.  Pyle retired in 1959 and returned to his home in Tempe, where he became active in community affairs and authored a popular newspaper column.

He received honorary LL.D. degrees from University of Redlands, Chapman University, Arizona State University, Lebanon College and Bradley University.

Death
 
Pyle died on November 29, 1987, in Tempe, Arizona, survived by his wife, Lucile, and two daughters, and is buried there in the Double Butte Cemetery.

References

External links

 
 Records of Howard Pyle, Dwight D. Eisenhower Presidential Library
 National Governors Association
 
 The Political Graveyard

|-

1906 births
1987 deaths
American radio personalities
Baptists from Arizona
Republican Party governors of Arizona
Mormon fundamentalism
People from Sheridan, Wyoming
Politicians from Tempe, Arizona